Conus caracteristicus, common name the characteristic cone, is a species of sea snail, a marine gastropod mollusk in the family Conidae, the cone snails and their allies.

Like all species within the genus Conus, these snails are predatory and venomous. They are capable of "stinging" humans, therefore live ones should be handled carefully or not at all.

Description
The size of the shell varies between 19 mm and 88 mm. The color of the shell is white, irregularly longitudinally flamed, forming two (or sometimes three) interrupted broad bands. The body whorl is somewhat inflated, rounded at the upper part, striate below. The spire is striate.

Distribution
This marine species occurs in the Indian Ocean off Northern KwaZulu-Natal, South Africa and East Africa; from the Bay of Bengal to Indonesia and Japan

References

 Lamarck, J. B. P. A., 1810. Description des espèces du genre Cône. Annales du Muséum d'Histoire Naturelle 15: 263–292
 Smith, E. A. 1877. Descriptions of new species of Conidae and Terebridae. Ann. Mag. nat. Hist. (4) 19: 222–231.
 Kohn, A.J., 1981. Type specimens and identity of the described species of Conus VI. The species described 1801–1810. Zoological Journal of the Linnean Society 71(3): 279–341
 Kohn, A.J., 1992. A chronological taxonomy of Conus, 1758–1840. Smithsonian Institution Press: 315 pp
 Röckel, D., Korn, W. & Kohn, A.J., 1995. Manual of the living Conidae. Volume 1: Indo-Pacific region. Hemmen: 517 pp
 Puillandre N., Duda T.F., Meyer C., Olivera B.M. & Bouchet P. (2015). One, four or 100 genera? A new classification of the cone snails. Journal of Molluscan Studies. 81: 1–23

External links
 The Conus Biodiversity website
 Cone Shells – Knights of the Sea
 
 Holotype in MNHN, Paris

caracteristicus
Gastropods described in 1807